"Rm9sbG93ZXJz" is the seventh episode of the eleventh season of the American science fiction television series The X-Files. The episode was written by Shannon Hamblin and Kristen Cloke, and directed by Glen Morgan. It aired on February 28, 2018, on Fox. The episode's title is Base64 code for "Followers" and the tagline for this episode is "VGhlIFRydXRoIGlzIE91dCBUaGVyZQ==", which translates to "The Truth Is Out There" in Base64.

The show centers on FBI special agents who work on unsolved paranormal cases called X-Files; focusing on the investigations of Fox Mulder (David Duchovny), and Dana Scully (Gillian Anderson) after their reinstatement in the FBI. In this episode, Mulder and Scully deal with various forms of artificial intelligence. The episode is told with minimal use of dialogue.

Plot

A voiceover recounts over a visual montage how, in 2016, a machine learning chatbot, released to the public via Twitter by a major software corporation, was shut down within a day after the bot, designed to copy and learn from human interactions, began posting racist and hateful messages; the narration ends with a warning that humans must take responsibility for the behaviour of AI.
 
Fox Mulder and Dana Scully visit a fully automated sushi restaurant, Forowā (cod-Japanese for “Follower”), but are preoccupied with their smartphones. Mulder receives a blobfish instead of the sushi he ordered but finds there is no-one to complain to, as there are no human staff and all the chefs are robots. Mulder refuses to leave a tip, but finds his credit card has become stuck in the payment slot. Mulder tries to use force to remove his card, but instead causes the restaurant to start shutting down. Scully manages to open the door with a chopstick but Mulder is forced to leave his card behind. 

Mulder and Scully return home separately, Scully taking an automated taxicab that begins speeding alarmingly. Both agents are bombarded with automated notifications from services they have used. Scully tries to call Mulder but cannot get a connection and is billed $250 when her home security system rejects her password. She unexpectedly receives a drone-delivered robotic vacuum cleaner but finds it too frustrating to use. Scully’s automated appliances begin to malfunction, gas begins to flow out of her fireplace, and the lights go out.

Mulder attempts to cancel his credit card and spots a drone spying on him. Presuming the operator to be a nosy child, he demands they stop before eventually breaking it with a baseball bat. Larger drones appear and retrieve the remains, and hundreds of tiny drones break into his home, forcing him to flee. 

Mulder arrives at Scully’s house but finds it has locked itself. Scully, smelling gas, breaks a screen door to escape just as the robotic vacuum cleaner runs over a dropped match and causes an explosion. Unable to call 911 on their phones and chased by drones, the agents attempt to flee, discarding their phones and other traceable electronics. They take shelter in a warehouse that turns out to be filled with quadrupedal robots and are ultimately cornered by a robot which returns Mulder’s phone. Confronted with Forowā’s tip screen, Mulder belatedly tips the restaurant 10%, causing the machines to retreat and their devices to stop harassing them. 

The next morning, Mulder and Scully have breakfast in a human-operated diner, paying with paper money, and ultimately putting their phones aside, sitting in contemplation and holding hands.

Production
In August 2017, it was announced that Kristen Cloke and Shannon Hamblin would be writing an episode based on a story by Glen Morgan, who directed the episode. This was the first X-Files script to be written by Cloke and Hamblin; Cloke (who is Glen Morgan's wife) had previously guest-starred in the fourth-season episode "The Field Where I Died"; and Hamblin has worked as Morgan's writer's assistant. Director Glen Morgan was inspired to tell a story visually, without dialog. Morgan had done a similar type of episode for Space: Above and Beyond, a TV series he co-created with X-Files writer James Wong, which starred Cloke.

Reception
"Rm9sbG93ZXJz" received very positive reviews from critics. On Rotten Tomatoes, it has an approval rating of 100% with an average rating of 8.2 out of 10 based on 13 reviews.

In its initial broadcast in the United States on February 28, 2018, it received 3.23 million viewers, which was down from the previous episode, which had 3.74 million viewers.

In December 2018, TV Guide ranked "Rm9sbG93ZXJz" as #23 in the 25 Best Episodes of TV in 2018, saying "'Rm9xbG93ZXJz' was a reminder of what X-Files used to be: insightful, terrifying and little bit playful."

References

External links

2018 American television episodes
The X-Files (season 11) episodes
Cyberpunk television episodes